This article is a list of things named  in the memory of the 18th century Swiss scientist Johann Heinrich Lambert:

Optics
 Beer–Lambert law 
Beer–Lambert–Bouguer law, see above
 lambert (unit)
Foot-lambert
 Lambert's cosine law
 Lambertian reflectance

Mathematics

 Lambert's theorem on the parabola
 Lambert azimuthal equal-area projection
 Lambert conformal conic projection
 Lambert cylindrical equal-area projection
 Lambert mean
 Lambert problem
 Lambert quadrilateral
 Lambert series
 Lambert's trinomial equation
 Lambert W function
 Lambertian function (inverse of the Gudermannian function)

Other
 187 Lamberta, asteroid
 Lambert (lunar crater). In the MARE IMBRIUM, Diameter: 30.1209 km
 Lambert (Martian crater). In the Sinus Sabaeus quadrangle of Mars, located at 20.2°S latitude and 334.7°W longitude. It is 92.0  km in diameter

References

Lambert